Valentijn Overeem (born 17 August 1976) is a retired Dutch professional mixed martial artist and kickboxer currently signed with United Glory. A professional competitor since 1996, he has previously fought for the PRIDE Fighting Championships, RINGS, KSW, the World Fighting Alliance, K-1, M-1 Global, Its Showtime, World Victory Road, and Strikeforce. He is the older brother of fellow MMA Superstar Alistair Overeem. Overeem has notable wins over fighters such as Randy Couture and Renato Sobral.

Biography
Overeem was born in Amersfoort, Utrecht but now lives in Turkey and is associated with the Imperial Athletics gym in Boca Raton, Florida where he trains with his younger brother Alistair. Along with his younger brother, Valentijn spent part of his childhood in England, which is where his brother was born.

RINGS
Valentijn was trained at the Chris Dolman gym, where he specialized in kickboxing and sambo before debuting at the Japanese professional wrestling promotion Fighting Network RINGS.

In 1999, Overeem participated in the RINGS King of Kings tournament, but he was submitted and eliminated by Antônio Rodrigo Nogueira at the first round.

He would perform better at the next edition of the tournament, advancing on the first round after eliminating sambo champion Suren Balachinskiy. Overeem earned a yellow card for holding the ropes to avoid a takedown at one point, but he made up by outstriking Suren and focusing on kicking his injured leg, finishing the match by knee strikes.

Valentijn then advanced further against famed luta livre practitioner Renato Sobral in an upset. Overeem was the superior striker, prompting Sobral to take him down. Overeem looked for a Kimura lock, the Brazilian reversed it into an armbar creating an exchange that ended with Overeem taking by accident an illegal punch to the jaw that almost knocked him out. As Overeem seemed unable to continue, both judges and the referee proposed to stop the match, but Valentijn's corner insisted on continuing. Returning to the fight, Overeem managed to compose himself and take down Babalu by kosoto gake, which the lutador countered by threatening with another armbar from the bottom. This time, however, Overeem captured a leg and quickly transitioned into a toehold, making Sobral tap out.

After eliminating Yoshihisa Yamamoto by armbar in under one minute, Overeem continued advancing, and got another upset by choking out Randy Couture in a failed takedown. The final match of the tournament was against Antônio Rodrigo Nogueira, with Overeem submitted once again in the first round.

Strikeforce
On 9 June 2010, Overeem signed to fight under the Strikeforce banner. He was scheduled to fight Antônio Silva on 4 December 2010, but suffered an injury that caused him to withdraw from the fight. He eventually made his promotional debut against Ray Sefo at Strikeforce: Fedor vs. Silva on 12 February 2011 where he won in the first round by using a neck crank.

Overeem then returned against Chad Griggs at Strikeforce: Overeem vs. Werdum on 18 June 2011, in Dallas, Texas. Overeem lost as he tapped out due to punches.

On 3 August 2011, Golden Glory announced that Overeem had been released from his contract by Strikeforce.

Post-Strikeforce
On 25 February, Overeem won his fight against Polish kickboxer and mixed martial artist Marcin Różalski at KSW 18 in Płock, Poland. He replaced injured Jérôme Le Banner and took the fight on 2 days notice. Overeem won by submission (toe hold) in the first round.

Overeem fought in a kickboxing match on 23 February 2013 after 16 years of inactivity as a professional kickboxer where he faced James Wilson, a former professional boxer turned kickboxer.  The fight was held in Miami on the debut event of S-1 Challenge, it ended in a No Contest decision due to an unsafe ring as both fighters fell over the ropes with Wilson falling twice.

On 7 December 2013, Overeem fought Mikhail Mokhnatkin at Fight Nights: Battle of Moscow 14. Overeem lost via KO in the first round.

Overeem faced Konstantin Gluhov in a rematch on 12 April 2014 at PFC 6: Pancrase Fighting Championship 6. Overeem lost by first-round KO.

Overeem would then lose his next bout against Ante Delija via TKO at HOG: House of Gladiators 9 in round one.

In 2013, Overeem featured in the video clip Street Credibility by the Belgian rapper CHG Unfadable.

Championships and accomplishments
Fighting Network RINGS
RINGS King of Kings 2000 Tournament Runner Up
RINGS Free Fight Dutch Heavyweight Champion
Durata World Grand Prix
Durata World Grand Prix 2003 Tournament Champion

Mixed martial arts record

|-
|  Loss
| align=center| 32–34
| Ante Delija
| TKO (punches)
| HOG: House of Gladiators 9
| 
| align=center| 1
| align=center| 1:24
| Dubrovnik, Croatia
|
|-
|  Loss
| align=center| 32–33
| Konstantin Gluhov
| KO (punch)
| PFC 6: Pancrase Fighting Championship 6
| 
| align=center| 1
| align=center| 2:33
| Marseille, France
| 
|-
|  Loss
| align=center| 32–32
| Mikhail Mokhnatkin
| TKO (submission to strikes)
| Fight Nights: Battle of Moscow 14
| 
| align=center| 1
| align=center| 4:45
| Moscow, Russia
|
|-
|  Loss
| align=center| 32–31
| Konstantin Gluhov
| KO (knee)
| PFC 5: Clash of the Titans
| 
| align=center| 1
| align=center| 2:48
| Marseille, France
| 
|-
|  Loss
| align=center| 32–30
| Michael Knaap
| TKO (punches)
| Beast of the East
| 
| align=center| 1
| align=center| 3:03
| Zutphen, The Netherlands
| 
|-
|  Loss
| align=center| 32–29
| Evgeny Erokhin
| TKO (punches)
| Pankration: Battle of Empires 2
| 
| align=center| 1
| align=center| 4:43
| Khabarovsk, Russia
| 
|-
|  Loss
| align=center| 32–28
| Michał Kita
| Submission (guillotine choke)
| Oktagon Italy
| 
| align=center| 1
| align=center| 4:03
| Assago, Lombardy, Italy
| 
|-
| Win
| align=center| 32–27
| Marcin Rózalski
| Submission (toe hold)
| KSW 18
| 
| align=center| 1
| align=center| 2:24
| Plock, Poland
| 
|-
| Loss
| align=center| 31–27
| Chad Griggs
| TKO (submission to punches)
| Strikeforce: Overeem vs. Werdum
| 
| align=center| 1
| align=center| 2:55
| Dallas, Texas, United States
| 
|-
| Win
| align=center| 31–26
| Ray Sefo
| Submission (baseball choke)
| Strikeforce: Fedor vs. Silva
| 
| align=center| 1
| align=center| 1:37
| East Rutherford, New Jersey, United States
| 
|-
| Win
| align=center| 30–26
| Catalin Zmarandescu
| KO (knee)
| K-1 World Grand Prix 2010 in Bucharest
| 
| align=center| 1
| align=center| 0:50
| Bucharest, Romania
| 
|-
| Win
| align=center| 29–26
| Tengiz Tedoradze
| KO (head kick)
| Pancrase Fighting Championship 2
| 
| align=center| 1
| align=center| 0:06
| Marseille, France
| 
|-
| Loss
| align=center| 28–26
| Rafal Dabrowski
| TKO (submission to punches)
| Beast of the East
| 
| align=center| 1
| align=center| 1:17
| Gdynia, Poland
| 
|-
| Loss
| align=center| 28–25
| Nikolai Onikienko
| TKO (broken nose)
| Ultimate Glory 11: A Decade of Fights
| 
| align=center| 1
| align=center| 0:47
| Amsterdam, Netherlands
| 
|-
| Win
| align=center| 28–24
| Kazuo Takahashi
| KO (flying knee)
| World Victory Road Presents: Sengoku 4
| 
| align=center| 1
| align=center| 2:42
| Japan
| 
|-
| Win
| align=center| 27–24
| Sasa Lazic
| Submission (kimura)
| LOTR: Schilt vs. Guelmino
| 
| align=center| 1
| align=center| 0:33
| Serbia
| 
|-
| Loss
| align=center| 26–24
| Milco Voorn
| Submission (choke)
| King of the Ring
| 
| align=center| 1
| align=center| 0:45
| Netherlands
| 
|-
| Loss
| align=center| 26–23
| Gilbert Yvel
| Submission (armbar)
| It's Showtime Boxing & MMA Event 2005 Amsterdam
| 
| align=center| 1
| align=center| 4:30
| Amsterdam, Netherlands
| 
|-
| Loss
| align=center| 26–22
| Shungo Oyama
| Submission (toe hold)
| HERO'S 1
| 
| align=center| 1
| align=center| 1:28
| Saitama, Saitama, Japan
| 
|-
| Loss
| align=center| 26–21
| Kresimir Bogdanovic
| TKO (injury)
| Ultimate Nokaut 1
| 
| align=center| 1
| align=center| N/A
| Croatia
| 
|-
| Win
| align=center| 26–20
| Ross Pointon
| TKO (elbows)
| Anarchy Fight Night
| 
| align=center| 1
| align=center| 0:59
| England
| 
|-
| Loss
| align=center| 25–20
| Dave Dalgliesh
| KO (punches)
| 2 Hot 2 Handle
| 
| align=center| 2
| align=center| N/A
| Netherlands
| 
|-
| Win
| align=center| 25–19
| Autimio Antonia
| KO (punches)
| CFC 1: Cage Carnage
| 
| align=center| 1
| align=center| 0:57
| Essex, England
| 
|-
| Win
| align=center| 24–19
| Roman Savochka
| Submission (guillotine choke)
|rowspan=3| Durata World Grand Prix 3
|rowspan=3|
| align=center| 1
| align=center| 0:31
|rowspan=3|Croatia
| 
|-
| Win
| align=center| 23–19
| Milco Voorn
| Submission (smother choke)
| align=center| 1
| align=center| 1:21
| 
|-
| Win
| align=center| 22–19
| Andrei Rudakov
| Submission (americana)
| align=center| 1
| align=center| 0:21
| 
|-
| Loss
| align=center| 21–19
| Dave Vader
| TKO (injury)
| It's Showtime 2003 Amsterdam
| 
| align=center| 1
| align=center| 3:22
| Amsterdam, Netherlands
| 
|-
| Loss
| align=center| 21–18
| Mikko Rupponen
| Decision (split)
| Fight Festival 7
| 
| align=center| 1
| align=center| 15:00
| Finland
| 
|-
| Loss
| align=center| 21–17
| Ibragim Magomedov
| TKO (corner stoppage)
| M-1 MFC: Russia vs. the World 5
| 
| align=center| 1
| align=center| 3:20
| Saint Petersburg, Russia
| 
|-
| Loss
| align=center| 21–16
| Ron Waterman
| Submission (americana)
| PRIDE 24
| 
| align=center| 1
| align=center| 2:18
| Japan
| 
|-
| Loss
| align=center| 21–15
| Rodney Glunder
| TKO (retirement)
| 2H2H 5: Simply the Best 5
| 
| align=center| 1
| align=center| 3:00
| Amsterdam, Netherlands
| 
|-
| Loss
| align=center| 21–14
| Aaron Brink
| TKO (punches)
| WFA 2: Level 2
| 
| align=center| 1
| align=center| 2:24
| Nevada, United States
| 
|-
| Win
| align=center| 21–13
| Marc Emmanuel
| TKO (leg kicks)
| 2H2H 4: Simply the Best 4
| 
| align=center| 1
| align=center| 1:12
| Netherlands
| 
|-
| Loss
| align=center| 20–13
| Igor Vovchanchyn
| Submission (heel hook)
| PRIDE 18
| 
| align=center| 1
| align=center| 4:35
| Fukuoka Prefecture, Japan
| 
|-
| Loss
| align=center| 20–12
| Assuerio Silva
| Submission (heel hook)
| PRIDE 15
| 
| align=center| 1
| align=center| 2:50
| Saitama, Saitama, Japan
| 
|-
| Loss
| align=center| 20–11
| Gary Goodridge
| TKO (submission to punches)
| PRIDE 14: Clash of the Titans
| 
| align=center| 1
| align=center| 2:39
| Yokohama, Japan
| 
|-
| Win
| align=center| 20–10
| Ian Freeman
| TKO (submission to knees)
| 2H2H 2: Simply The Best
| 
| align=center| 1
| align=center| 1:42
| Netherlands
| 
|-
| Loss
| align=center| 19–10
| Antônio Rodrigo Nogueira
| Submission (arm-triangle choke)
|rowspan=3|RINGS: King of Kings 2000 Final
|rowspan=3|
| align=center| 1
| align=center| 1:20
|rowspan=3|Tokyo, Japan
| 
|-
| Win
| align=center| 19–9
| Randy Couture
| Submission (guillotine choke)
| align=center| 1
| align=center| 0:56
| 
|-
| Win
| align=center| 18–9
| Yoshihisa Yamamoto
| Submission (armbar)
| align=center| 1
| align=center| 0:45
| 
|-
| Win
| align=center| 17–9
| Jerrel Venetiaan
| Submission (toe hold)
| It's Showtime: Christmas Edition
| 
| align=center| 1
| align=center| 1:27
| Haarlem, Netherlands
| 
|-
| Win
| align=center| 16–9
| Suren Balachinskiy
| TKO (knees)
|rowspan=2|RINGS: King of Kings 2000 Block A
|rowspan=2|
| align=center| 1
| align=center| 2:13
|rowspan=2|Tokyo, Japan
| 
|-
| Win
| align=center| 15–9
| Renato Sobral
| Submission (toe hold)
| align=center| 1
| align=center| 2:19
| 
|-
| Win
| align=center| 14–9
| Joe Slick
| Submission (achilles lock)
| RINGS: Millennium Combine 3
| 
| align=center| 1
| align=center| 0:36
| Osaka, Japan
| 
|-
| Win
| align=center| 13–9
| Tuli Kulihaapai
| Technical Submission (armbar)
|rowspan=2|RINGS USA: Rising Stars Block B
|rowspan=2|
| align=center| 1
| align=center| 2:05
|rowspan=2|Hawaii, United States
| 
|-
| Loss
| align=center| 12–9
| Tommy Sauer
| TKO (punches)
| align=center| 1
| align=center| 0:35
| 
|-
| Win
| align=center| 12–8
| Brad Kohler
| Submission (kneebar)
| RINGS: Millennium Combine 2
| 
| align=center| 1
| align=center| 0:31
| Tokyo, Japan
| 
|-
| Win
| align=center| 11–8
| Fatih Kocamis
| KO (punch)
| RINGS Holland: Di Capo Di Tutti Capi
| 
| align=center| 2
| align=center| 0:47
| Netherlands
| 
|-
| Loss
| align=center| 10–8
| Achmed Labasanov
| Submission (achilles lock)
| RINGS Russia: Russia vs. The World
| 
| align=center| 1
| align=center| 3:50
| Yekaterinburg, Russia
| 
|-
| Win
| align=center| 10–7
| Dennis Reed
| Technical Submission (guillotine choke)
| 2 Hot 2 Handle 1
| 
| align=center| 1
| align=center| 0:28
| Netherlands
| 
|-
| Loss
| align=center| 9–7
| Hiromitsu Kanehara
| KO (punch)
| RINGS Holland: There Can Only Be One Champion
| 
| align=center| 1
| align=center| 4:14
| Netherlands
| 
|-
| Loss
| align=center| 9–6
| Antônio Rodrigo Nogueira
| Technical Submission (americana)
| RINGS: King of Kings 1999 Block A
| 
| align=center| 1
| align=center| 1:51
| Tokyo, Japan
| 
|-
| Win
| align=center| 9–5
| Hiromitsu Kanehara
| TKO (corner stoppage)
| RINGS: Rise 3rd
| 
| align=center| 1
| align=center| 4:35
| Japan
| 
|-
| Loss
| align=center| 8–5
| Yoshihisa Yamamoto
| Submission (armbar)
| RINGS: Rise 1st
| 
| align=center| 1
| align=center| 2:40
| Japan
| 
|-
| Loss
| align=center| 8–4
| Gilbert Yvel
| TKO (shoulder injury)
| RINGS Holland: Who's the Boss
| 
| align=center| 1
| align=center| 0:38
| Netherlands
| 
|-
| Win
| align=center| 8–3
| Kiyoshi Tamura
| Submission (kneebar)
| RINGS: Fighting Integration II
| 
| align=center| 1
| align=center| 6:39
| Osaka, Japan
| 
|-
| Win
| align=center| 7–3
| Kenichi Yamamoto
| TKO (knee)
| RINGS: Fighting Integration
| 
| align=center| 1
| align=center| 6:36
| Japan
| 
|-
| Win
| align=center| 6–3
| Dexter Casey
| Submission (guillotine choke)
| Night of the Samurai 1
| 
| align=center| 1
| align=center| 1:50
| England
| 
|-
| Win
| align=center| 5–3
| Chris Haseman
| Decision (majority)
| RINGS Holland: The King of Rings
| 
| align=center| 2
| align=center| 5:00
| Netherlands
| 
|-
| Loss
| align=center| 4–3
| Wataru Sakata
| Submission (toe hold)
| RINGS: Extension Fighting 7
| 
| align=center| 1
| align=center| 2:16
| Sapporo, Japan
| 
|-
| Loss
| align=center| 4–2
| Mitsuya Nagai
| Submission (heel hook)
| Rings: Fighting Extension III
| 
| align=center| 1
| align=center| 4:58
| Sendai, Japan
| 
|-
| Win
| align=center| 4–1
| Cees Bezems
| Submission (heel hook)
| RINGs Holland: Utrecht at War
| 
| align=center| 1
| align=center| 0:56
| Netherlands
| 
|-
| Win
| align=center| 3–1
| Masayuki Naruse
| TKO (doctor stoppage)
| RINGS Holland: The Final Challenge
| 
| align=center| 1
| align=center| 3:58
| Netherlands
| 
|-
| Loss
| align=center| 2–1
| Wataru Sakata
| Submission (armbar)
| RINGS: Maelstrom V
| 
| align=center| 1
| align=center| 6:24
| Osaka, Japan
| 
|-
| Win
| align=center| 2–0
| Jeroen Waringa
| KO (punch)
| Fight Gala: Mix Fight Night
| 
| align=center| 1
| align=center| N/A
| Netherlands
| 
|-
| Win
| align=center| 1–0
| Tjerk Vermanen
| Submission (rear-naked choke)
| RINGS Holland: Kings of Martial Arts
| 
| align=center| 1
| align=center| 0:44
| Netherlands
|

Kickboxing record

|-  bgcolor="#c5d2ea"
| 2013-02-23 || NC ||align=left| James Wilson ||S-1 Challenge || Miami, USA ||NC (Unsafe ring) || N/A || N/A
|-  bgcolor="#ffbbbb"
| 1997 || Loss ||align=left| Remy Bonjasky || Vini Vidi Vici || Netherlands || TKO (Corner stoppage)|| 2 || N/A
|-
| colspan=9 | Legend:

See also 
List of male mixed martial artists
List of Strikeforce alumni

References

External links

1976 births
Living people
Dutch male mixed martial artists
Heavyweight mixed martial artists
Mixed martial artists utilizing kickboxing
Mixed martial artists utilizing sambo
Mixed martial artists utilizing Brazilian jiu-jitsu
Dutch sambo practitioners
Dutch people of Jamaican descent
Dutch male kickboxers
Dutch male sport wrestlers
Dutch practitioners of Brazilian jiu-jitsu
People awarded a black belt in Brazilian jiu-jitsu
Sportspeople from Amersfoort